Omar Ishtiaq (1931 – 19 July 1982) was an Iraqi weightlifter from Basra, Iraq. He won a bronze medal in the lightweight division at the 1960 Summer Olympics and became the only person to have won an Olympic medal for Iraq.

References

External links
Profile

1931 births
1982 deaths
Iraqi male weightlifters
Weightlifters at the 1960 Summer Olympics
Olympic weightlifters of Iraq
Olympic bronze medalists for Iraq
Olympic medalists in weightlifting
Medalists at the 1960 Summer Olympics
Sportspeople from Basra
World Weightlifting Championships medalists
20th-century Iraqi people